Carlos Eduardo Martinez Simon-Llanos (born December 5, 1978) better known as Patafunk is a Venezuelan DJ, Producer, multi-instrumentalist, Singer-Songwriter who's been always searching for ocean-like sounds and music inspired by the sea.

In 1997 he entered a recording studio for the first time to record "No Es Mi Guerra" a fast Latin Ska Song which was featured on Venezuela Ska vol 1 edited in Mexico by Pepe Lobo Records.

Skama recorded a few more tracks for other compilations and it was Maracaibo City's opening act for latinoamerican bands like Amigos Invisibles, Aterciopelados, Cafe Tacuba, Control Machete, Molotov and others.

In 2000/2001 Pata started his career as a DJ by selecting music as the guest selector of city-renown DJ Juan Badell, who held the legendary nights at 'Los Palafitos' in Maracaibo Venezuela, at this point Pata played a selection of Ska, Reggae, Swing, Lounge and other eclectic sounds but shortly after, Pata felt in love with House Music, in 2002 Pata spent some time in San Francisco CA, where his uncle used to live, in this extended trip, Pata absorbed the west coast sound and became a House Music DJ, starting his first DJ residence, Tuesdays at Fuse in North Beach, San Francisco with Spanish DJ's Malaguita Connection and Sweet Boy and French DJ Petula Washington.

In 2003 Pata came back to Maracaibo, Venezuela and teams up with DJ's and artists Carlito's Way, Guille, ETB and Andres Meza to produce House Music massive events 'Patafunk' where House Music, Art and Fashion were combined in a way that attracted different types of people into one magic sound.

Shortly after he started his first radio show 'Patafunk Radio' in La Mega de Maracaibo, a year later starts commercial radio by hosting and producing "El Disco Es Cultura" from Monday to Friday from 2 pm to 4 pm on the same Station, in 2007 Patafunk Radio goes is aired nationwide from La Mega de Caracas/Nacional every Saturday from 9 pm to 10 pm every Saturday, this show was in the air till 2014.

Between 2008 and 2011, Patafunk released two critically acclaimed albums: 'Dubdelic' and 'Playa', an eclectic arrangement of music that merges Latin, pop, and disco-funk. His songs topped the charts in Venezuelan radio, and outlets like Rolling Stone Latin America, Billboard Magazine, and MTV Latin America praised Patafunk for his distinctively pleasant, “ocean-like” sound. Patafunk became a household in the Venezuelan music scene, delivering multiple nationwide tours and championing his own radio show on contemporary music.

In 2010, Patafunk left his tropical coast of Caracas to take on the international dynamism of the New York City music scene. In the years that followed, Patafunk developed into a prolific DJ and producer, releasing a series of original singles and remixing songs for the likes of The Knocks, Goldroom, Phoenix, Pat Lok, and others. As a DJ, Patafunk regularly plays throughout NYC and has held residencies at NYC staples such as Ophelia, Buddakan, Zuma, Soho House, Cafe Noir, Le Bain, and Hotel Hugo; while his tropical, global sound has enlivened audiences at shows and festivals around the world, including SXSW, Tribeca Film Festival, CMJ, and Miami Art Basel.

Patafunk's third album High Life!, was released on June 18, 2020, and it fuses his Latin-reggae roots with the best of New York's multicultural ethos. This album counts with more than 25 musicians and is released by Greenpoint Records with 6 music videos and the song 'Solo' hitting the Venezuelan Charts

In November 2020 and after 10 years full of incredible experiences in NYC, 'Pata' moved to La Jolla CA, to focus on making music close to the west coast waters, this period was very productive, Pata found himself in many ways surrounded by the incredible Cali vibes easily spotted in future productions like his fourth album, 'El Baile de la Extinción' also the first demos for the series of instrumental music called 'Patavision' then polished, published and currently and in a continuous progress.

In those Cali times, Patafunk worked on the production of music videos by French director Julien Crebassa and Boricuoa DP for the songs 'Bailando' and 'Olvidar' from the album 'High Life!' 'que Vamos a Hacer?' from new album 'EBDLE' and finally the video and song 'El Rezo e' Calle' collaboration with French producer 'DJ Damasta'

After those 8 months Patafunk moved to Miami Beach to be the 1 mAn-bAnd of the popular Venezuelan webshow 'Entregrados' also making the music for the exhibition of Venezuelan painter ' Edo Ilustrado' and appearing in shows like 'George Harris' and reconnecting in general with the Venezuelan audience.

Patafunk is one of the DJs at Juvia Miami alternating with DJ,  Radio Personality and Collector, David Rondón.

In January 14 Patafunk's fourth album 'El Baile de la Extincion' is released with the first single 'Que Vamos a Hacer?' this album contains 9 songs of a tropical afro-caribeean folk and with a more mature lyrics and a more raw acoustic-electronic sound

By December 2022, Patafunk accomplished to release 50 Singles on the weekly series 'Patavision' based on those beach jams he started in La Jolla one year before. Patavision is now, Pata's main studio project, producion, mixing, mastering and releasing new music and lately, recording some of the process in video to share them before the official release every week.

Discography

Albums
El Baile de la Extinción - (2022)
High Life! - (2020) 
Playa - (2011)
Dubdelic - (2008)

Singles

"Hit & Run!" feat DaniBlau - (2015)
"Free Your Feet" feat Sephira - (2014)
"Free & Original" - (2012)
"I Want To See You Again" feat Skip Rage - (2012)

Weekly Series 

PATAVSION - SEASON 04 
"Patavision 60" - (2023)
"Patavision 59" - (2023)
"Patavision 58" - (2022)
"Patavision 57" - (2022)
"Patavision 56" - (2022)
"Patavision 55" - (2022)

PATAVSION - SEASON 03 
"Patavision 54" - (2023)
"Patavision 53" - (2023)
"Patavision 52" - (2022)
"Patavision 51" - (2022)
"Patavision 50" - (2022)
"Patavision 49" - (2022)
"Patavision 48" - (2022)
"Patavision 47" - (2022)
"Patavision 46" - (2022)
"Patavision 45" - (2022)
"Patavision 44" - (2022)
"Patavision 43" - (2022)
"Patavision 42" - (2022)
"Patavision 41" - (2022)
"Patavision 40" - (2022)
"Patavision 39" - (2022)
"Patavision 38" - (2022)
"Patavision 37" - (2022)

PATAVISION SEASON 02 
"Patavision 36" - (2022)
"Patavision 35" - (2022)
"Patavision 34" - (2022)
"Patavision 33" - (2022)
"Patavision 32" - (2022)
"Patavision 31" - (2022)
"Patavision 30" - (2022)
"Patavision 29" - (2022)
"Patavision 28" - (2022)
"Patavision 27" - (2022)
"Patavision 26" - (2022)
"Patavision 25" - (2022)
"Patavision 24" - (2022)
"Patavision 23" - (2022)
"Patavision 22" - (2022)
"Patavision 21" - (2022)
"Patavision 20" - (2022)
"Patavision 19" - (2022)

PATAVISION SEASON 01
"Patavision 18" - (2022) 
"Patavision 17" - (2022)
"Patavision 16" - (2022)
"Patavision 15" - (2022)
"Patavision 14" - (2022)
"Patavision 13" - (2022)
"Patavision 12" - (2022)
"Patavision 11" - (2022)
"Patavision 10" - (2022)
"Patavision 09" - (2022)
"Patavision 08" - (2022)
"Patavision 07" - (2022)
"Patavision 06" - (2022)
"Patavision 05" - (2022)
"Patavision 04" - (2022)
"Patavision 03" - (2021)
"Patavision 02" - (2021)
"Patavision 01" - (2021)

Remixes
 BLOND:ISH & Rowee - Garden Of 3den _ (2021)
 Nerio's Dubwork & Darryl Pandy - "Feel It" (2016)
 Minoo Javan - "Nessa Nessa" (2016)
 De La Soul feat Shaka Khan – "All Good?" (2015)
 The Wailing Wailers - "Simmer Down" (2015)
 C+ - "Who's The One" (2014)
 Pat Lok & Bear Mountain – "Same Hearts" (2014)
 Eddie Amador – "House Music" (2013)
 Treasure Fingers & The Knocks – "My Body" (2013)
 Goldroom – "Morgan's Bay" - (2013)
 Phoenix – "Trying To be Cool" - (2013)
 The Sandals – "The Endless Summer" - (2013)
 Willie Colón & Hector Lavoe – "Todo Tiene Su Final" - (2013)
 The B-52's – "Love Shack" - (2013)
 Stardust – "Music Sounds Better With You" - (2012)
 Sunsplash – "Interference" - (2011)
 Mirla Castellanos – "Con El Corazon En Las Manos" - (2010)
 Aldemaro Romero – "La Caracola" - (2007)

See also
Venezuelan music

References

External links
Patafunk Official website

Living people
Venezuelan musicians
Latin music musicians
Reggae musicians
Funk musicians
Venezuelan DJs
1978 births